Chhamb, also known as Iftikharabad, named after Iftikhar Khan Janjua is an area in the southern tip of Azad Kashmir, Pakistan. The Chhamb sector consists of many villages, Kherowal, Burejal, Nagial, Paur, Dingawali, Chak Pandit, Praganwala, Jhanda, Singry, Sardari, Banian, Punjgran, all of these villages are located within Chhamb sector. People are from various ethnic groups such as Gujjars, Bakerwals, Paharis, Khokhars, and Mughals.  A Baradari system is prevalent throughout the region.

The Pakistan Army has built its infrastructure in Chhamb.  Most people's languages are Pahari-Pothwari and Punjabi. Chhamb is also known as Iftikharabad due to Maj General Iftikhar Khan Janjua who played a key role in liberating Chhamb. It is divided into two parts South Iftikharabad and North Iftikharabad. There is only one police station (Singry).

Chhamb sector was under Indian control until the War of 1971, when the Pakistan Army captured the area. Chhamb is the last outpost of Pakistan's Azad Kashmir. Chhamb has fertile land and farmlands can be found here.

1965 War 
Chhamb came under the Indian side as per the 1949 cease-fire agreement. During the Indo-Pakistani War of 1965, the Pakistani troops invaded the Chhamb-Jaurian sector of Indian-administered Kashmir as part of Operation Grand Slam and made significant gains. However, the status quo ante was reestablished in the Tashkent Agreement.

1971 War 

The Pakistan Army made another attempt to capture this strategically important area and invaded Chhamb on the same principles as it invaded in 1965. The reason behind this plan was to deter Indians from attacking the crucial north–south line of communications passing via Gujrat. The fighting around Chamb was intensely fierce and took a toll on both the advancing Pakistani troops and the Indian regiments. On 9 December 1971, the first Pakistani troops entered the surrounding area around Chhamb under the personal supervision of Maj General Iftikhar Khan Janjua.

A memorial of Maj General Iftikhar Khan Janjua is located in Chhamb where his helicopter crashed during the battle. He was immediately evacuated to CMH Kharian, but could not survive the wounds and succumbed- just days before Chhamb was captured. He was awarded the Hilal-e-Jurat.

The Chhamb sector had a population of around 10,000 people at the time it was captured. The area became a ghost town as most of its residents fled to India following the Pakistani takeover.

Since 1971 
In 2020, Gen Bajwa visited the Chhamb sector and emphasised upon troops to extend all-out support to local population affected by ceasefire violations.

Education 
A Boys College (Kherowal), a Girls College (Dingawali), a Boys High School (Porre), and a Girls High School (Punjgran) are located here.  The people who belong to the south are Punjabi and the north is mostly Paharis and Gujjars from Rajauri. It is agricultural land. The people are mostly farmers. The members of the Chackmerry community in Chhamb are descendants of early Gujjar settlers who had arrived here from Rajauri in India.

References

Populated places in Bhimber District